San Asensio is a municipality and town in the La Rioja autonomous community, northern Spain.

Viticulture
San Asensio has a tradition of wine production and is known for its rosés. 
Production is regulated by the Denominación de origen system. The Rioja DOC is divided into 3 sub-regions, San Asensio being in Rioja Alta.

References

Municipalities in La Rioja (Spain)